The 2005 MAAC men's basketball tournament was held March 4–7 at HSBC Arena in Buffalo, New York.

Top-seeded  defeated  in the championship game, 81–59, to win their first MAAC men's basketball tournament.

The Purple Eagles received an automatic bid to the 2005 NCAA tournament.

Format
All ten of the conference's members participated in the tournament field. They were seeded based on regular season conference records.

As the regular-season champion, top seed  received a bye to the semifinals.

Bracket

References

MAAC men's basketball tournament